Vakhtang Pantskhava (born 8 October 1989 in Tskhaltubo) is a Georgian football player. He previously played for Győri ETO FC.

References

External links
 

1989 births
Living people
People from Tskhaltubo
Footballers from Georgia (country)
Association football forwards
FC Gagra players
Expatriate footballers from Georgia (country)
Expatriate footballers in France
Le Mans FC players
Expatriate sportspeople from Georgia (country) in France
Expatriate footballers in Ukraine
FC Metalist Kharkiv players
Expatriate sportspeople from Georgia (country) in Ukraine
Expatriate footballers in Hungary
Győri ETO FC players
Expatriate sportspeople from Georgia (country) in Hungary
Vasas SC players
FC Dinamo Tbilisi players